Ngoun Chan Devith (Khmer: ងួន ចាន់ដេវីត; born October 5, 1994) better known by his stage name G-Devith or Dit-Way, is a Cambodian rapper, singer-songwriter, and music Producer. He used to record for Rasmey Hang Meas Production but in 2019, he created his own label under the name of Dit-Way Nation. Devith began his career in 2014.

Discography

Music
 2014: LIVE FAST DIE YOUNG
 2014: Forever
 2014: 3 word
 2015: មានអីមិនល្អ 
 2016: ជីវិតខ្ញុំ ( MY LIFE ) 
 2016: រាំញីកែងជើង
 2016: មនុស្សប្រុសម្នាក់នេះចេះឈឺចាប់ហើយ
 2017: Drunk Again 
 2018: BODY (KHMER VER.)
 2018: BODY (THAI VER.)
 2018: អតីតកាលចោលម្សៀត ( USELESS PAST)
 2018: FAKE FRIEND
 2018: FXXK WITH ME
 2018: 43 FORTY-THREE
 2019: ជឿជាក់លើខ្លួនឯង (BELIEVE IN YOURSELF )
 2019: IDOL កំហូច
 2019: បង្វិកភព
 2019: សុំទោសផងដែលអោយឈឺ (SORRY THAT I HURT YOU )
 2019: ប្រអប់ទិព្វ (Don’t Play With The Toy )
 2019: JEALOUS 
 2019: IF I DIE 
 2020: OUTSIDER
 2020: KHMER BOY
 2022: បងប្រាប់ថាកុំៗៗៗ (Don’t Just Don’t)

Performances
 2014: Teen Zone Concert (Khmer: តំបន់យុវវ័យ)
 2015: Water Music Concert (Khmer: តន្ត្រីលើទឹក)
 2016: MYTV A1 Modern Concert (Khmer: តន្ត្រីសម័យទំនើបអេវ័ន)
 2016: Special Concert (Khmer: តន្ត្រីពិសេស)
 2014–present: Hang Meas Tour Concerts (Tour Concerts are available on special events)
 2019: G-devith Reborn concert (Khmer: ការប្រគំតន្រ្តីរីបន)

References

 តាមពិតតារាចម្រៀង G-Devith មានរឿង ១០ចំណុច ប្រិយមិត្តអាចមិនចាប់ភ្លឹក!. Sabay News. Retrieved December 7, 2016. 
 ផ្អើលនាំគ្នាស្តាប់ G-Devith បកស្រាយ ចម្រៀងរ៉េប រហូតចង់ ដាច់ខ្យល់ គ្រប់ៗគ្នា. KhmerLoad. Retrieved June 21, 2014. 
 បូព្រឹក្ស និង G-Devith កក្រើករឿងស្នេហ៍ជាថ្មី. Post Khmer. Retrieved March 7, 2017. 
 Song no hit with ministry. The Phnom Penh Post. Retrieved March 4, 2016.

External links
 G-Devith on Facebook
ditwayforever on Instagram 

Living people
21st-century Cambodian male singers
21st-century rappers
1994 births
People from Phnom Penh